Cesar Castellani (died 2 August 1905) was an architect.  He was born in Malta. He was attracted by the prosperity of British Guiana and emigrated there in 1860 with a group of Italian priests.

Designs
Castellani designed a number of prominent buildings in Guyana, including Brickdam Cathedral; Castellani House, once the Guyana Prime Minister's residence; the Brickdam Police Station; and the New Amsterdam Public Hospital.

He made alterations and additions to the Church of the Sacred Heart on Main Street (1872-1882), which opened in 1861, for the colony's Madeiran labourers.

The design of the Victoria Law Courts, credited to Baron Harco Theodor Hora Siccama, has Castellani's signature style, and Castellani was working for Siccama as a draughtsman.

In 1875, he completed the installation of a sunken panelled ceiling of the Parliamentary chamber in the eastern wing of the Parliament Building.

Cesar Castellani died in Georgetown, British Guiana on 2 August 1905.

References

History of Guyana
1905 deaths
19th-century Maltese architects
Year of birth missing
British Guiana people
Maltese emigrants to Guyana
Immigrants to British Guiana